Robert Ernest "Rob" Stull (born September 5, 1960) is an American modern pentathlete and épée fencer. He competed at the 1984, 1988  and 1992 Summer Olympics and placed 20th individually in 1988 and second with the modern pentathlon team in 1984 and fourth in 1992. After retiring from competitions Stull became a sports official. He is the managing director of the USA Pentathlon, a member of the United States Olympic Committee, and President of the Confederation of Modern Pentathlon for North America, Central America and the Caribbean.

References

External links
 

1960 births
Living people
American male épée fencers
American male modern pentathletes
Olympic fencers of the United States
Olympic modern pentathletes of the United States
Fencers at the 1988 Summer Olympics
Modern pentathletes at the 1988 Summer Olympics
Modern pentathletes at the 1992 Summer Olympics
Sportspeople from Fort Lauderdale, Florida
Pan American Games medalists in modern pentathlon
Pan American Games gold medalists for the United States
Pan American Games medalists in fencing
Pan American Games silver medalists for the United States
Modern pentathletes at the 1987 Pan American Games
20th-century American people